Mead Ranch is a census-designated place (CDP) in Gila County, Arizona, United States. The population was 38 at the 2010 census.

Geography
The CDP is located in northern Gila County at the southern foot of the Mogollon Rim.

Demographics

References

Census-designated places in Gila County, Arizona
Populated places of the Mogollon Rim